3a 
Bolívar is a location in the Cochabamba Department, Bolivia. It is the seat of the Bolívar Province.

External links 
 Map of Bolívar Province

Populated places in Cochabamba Department